Fodé Bangaly Diakité (born January 26, 1985, in Dabakala) is an Ivorian footballer.

Career 

He formerly played for Selafe FC, Toumodi FC, Issia Wazi, Anderlecht's B team, R. Union Saint-Gilloise, Chonburi, Home United, and Pattaya United.
He signed with Paris FC in January 2009, and returned to Chonburi in 2012.

References

External links

http://th.soccerway.com/players/diakite-fode-bangaly/73330/

1985 births
Living people
Ivorian footballers
Fode Bangaly Diakite
Fode Bangaly Diakite
Fode Bangaly Diakite
Expatriate footballers in Thailand
Ivorian expatriate sportspeople in Thailand
Home United FC players
Expatriate footballers in Singapore
Singapore Premier League players
Paris FC players
Expatriate footballers in France
Ivorian expatriates in France
Issia Wazy players
Toumodi FC players
Association football central defenders
Association football fullbacks
People from Vallée du Bandama District